White Oak is an unincorporated community in Henry County, Alabama, United States.

References

Unincorporated communities in Henry County, Alabama
Unincorporated communities in Alabama